Belocephalus davisi, or Davis's conehead, is a species of conehead in the family Tettigoniidae. It is found in North America.

References

Conocephalinae
Articles created by Qbugbot
Insects described in 1916